Urasar is a town in Armenia's Lori Province.

References 

Populated places in Lori Province